Decoding Chomsky: Science and Revolutionary Politics is a 2016 book by the linguistic anthropologist Chris Knight on Noam Chomsky's approach to science and politics. Knight admires Chomsky's politics, but argues that his linguistic theories were influenced in damaging ways by his immersion since the early 1950s in an intellectual culture heavily dominated by US military priorities, an immersion deepened when he secured employment in a Pentagon-funded electronics laboratory in the Massachusetts Institute of Technology.

In October 2016, Chomsky dismissed the book, telling The New York Times that it was based on a false assumption since, in fact, no military "work was being done on campus" during his time at MIT. In a subsequent public comment, Chomsky on similar grounds denounced Knight's entire narrative as a "wreck ... complete nonsense throughout". In contrast, a reviewer for the US Chronicle of Higher Education described Decoding Chomsky as perhaps "the most in-depth meditation on 'the Chomsky problem' ever published". In the UK, the New Scientist described Knight's account as "trenchant and compelling". The controversy continued in the London Review of Books, where the sociologist of science Hilary Rose cited Decoding Chomsky approvingly, provoking Chomsky to denounce what he called "Knight's astonishing performance" in two subsequent letters. The debate around Decoding Chomsky then continued in Open Democracy, with contributions from Frederick Newmeyer, Randy Allen Harris and others.

Since the book was published, Knight has published what he claims is evidence that Chomsky worked on a military sponsored "command and control" project for the MITRE Corporation in the early 1960s.

The argument 

Decoding Chomsky begins with Chomsky's claim that his political and scientific outputs have little connection with each other. For example, asked in 2006 whether his science and his politics are related, Chomsky replied that the connection is "almost non-existent ... There is a kind of loose, abstract connection in the background. But if you look for practical connections, they're non-existent."

Knight accepts that scientific research and political involvement are distinct kinds of activity serving very different purposes. But he claims that, in Chomsky's case, the conflicts intrinsic to his institutional situation forced him to drive an unusually deep and damaging wedge between his politics and his science.

Knight points out that Chomsky began his career working in an electronics laboratory whose primary technological mission he detested on moral and political grounds. Funded by the Pentagon, the Research Laboratory of Electronics at MIT was involved in contributing to the basic research required for hi-tech weapons systems. Suggesting that he was well aware of MIT's role at the time, Chomsky himself recalls: 

It was because of his anti-militarist conscience, Knight argues, that such research priorities were experienced by him as deeply troubling. By way of evidence, Knight cites George Steiner in a 1967 The New York Review of Books article, "Will Noam Chomsky announce that he will stop teaching at MIT or anywhere in this country so long as torture and napalm go on? ... Will he even resign from a university very largely implicated in the kind of 'strategic studies' he so rightly scorns?" Chomsky said, "I have given a good bit of thought to the specific suggestions that you put forth... leaving the country or resigning from MIT, which is, more than any other university, associated with activities of the department of 'defense.' ... As to MIT, I think that its involvement in the war effort is tragic and indefensible."

Chomsky's situation at MIT, according to Knight, is summed up by Chomsky when he describes some of his colleagues this way: 

In order to maintain his moral and political integrity, Knight argues, Chomsky resolved to limit his cooperation to pure linguistic theory of such an abstract kind that it could not conceivably have any military use.

With this aim in mind, Chomsky's already highly abstract theoretical modelling became so unusually abstract that not even language's practical function in social communication could be acknowledged or explored. One damaging consequence, according to Knight, was that scientific investigation of the ways in which real human beings use language became divorced from what quickly became the prevailing MIT school of formal linguistic theory.

Knight argues that the conflicting pressures Chomsky experienced had the effect of splitting his intellectual output in two, prompting him to ensure that any work he conducted for the military was purely theoretical—of no practical use to anyone—while his activism, being directed relentlessly against the military, was preserved free of any obvious connection with his science.

To an unprecedented extent, according to Knight, mind in this way became divorced from body, thought from action, and knowledge from its practical applications, these disconnects characterizing a philosophical paradigm which came to dominate much of intellectual life for half a century across the Western world.

Reception 

Decoding Chomsky has been both criticised and acclaimed by a wide variety of commentators.

Norbert Hornstein and Nathan J. Robinson dismiss the book as betraying a complete misunderstanding of Chomsky's linguistic theories and beliefs. They question the motives of Yale University Press, asking why Yale considered it appropriate to publish Knight's critique, which they say attacks Chomsky through political conjecture rather than addressing his linguistic or political ideas. Comparing Knight's Marxist criticism to a conservative criticism that was released in the same year by Tom Wolfe, they speculate that both were published with similar motivations – that Chomsky's criticisms were a threat to the power behind the publishers.(Current Affairs).

Robert Barsky argues that since Knight was never formally trained in Chomsky's conception of theoretical linguistics, he has no right to comment on whether it stands up as science. Decoding Chomsky, claims Barsky, offers no original insights, consisting only of "a weak rehash of critiques from naysayers to Chomsky's approach". While Barsky concedes that Chomsky did work in a military laboratory, he argues that this cannot be significant since virtually all US scientists receive Pentagon funding one way or another. (Moment).

Peter Stone claims that Knight hates Chomsky and "for that reason, he wrote Decoding Chomsky – a nasty, mean-spirited, vitriolic, ideologically-driven hatchet job". Stone states that, although Knight is on the Left, "the level of venom on display here exceeds that of all but the most unhinged of Chomsky’s detractors on the Right." He goes   to state that "Knight spares no opportunity to paint Chomsky’s every thought and deed in the blackest possible terms" and that: "Decoding Chomsky is not a critique of a body of work in linguistics; it is an attempt to demonise a man for his perceived political deviations, even though that man happens to be on the same side of the political spectrum as the man who is demonising him. Reading Decoding Chomsky taught me something about the mindset of the prosecutors in the Moscow Show Trials."

Decoding Chomsky was positively received by various scientists and commentators including: Michael Tomasello, Daniel Everett, David Hawkes, Luc Steels, Sarah Blaffer Hrdy and Frederick Newmeyer. Reviewing the book in The Times Literary Supplement, Houman Barekat commended Knight for an “engaging and thought-provoking intellectual history”.  In The American Ethnologist Sean O'Neill said of the book: “History comes alive via compelling narrative. ... Knight is indeed an impressive historian when it comes to recounting the gripping personal histories behind Chomsky's groundbreaking contributions to science and philosophy.”

The linguist Daniel Everett wrote that "Knight's exploration is unparalleled. No other study has provided such a full understanding of Chomsky's background, intellectual foibles, objectives, inconsistencies, and genius." The linguist Gary Lupyan wrote that Knight “makes a compelling case for the scientific vacuousness of [Chomsky’s linguistic] ideas.” Another linguist, Bruce Nevin, wrote that Knight “shows how Chomsky has acquiesced in—more than that, has participated in and abetted—a radical post-war transformation of the relation of science to society, legitimating one of the significant political achievements of the right, the pretense that science is apolitical.”

The philosopher Thomas Klikauer wrote that Decoding Chomsky is "an insightful book and, one might say, a-pleasure-to-read kind of book." Another philosopher, Rupert Read described the book as “a brilliant, if slightly harsh, disquisition”. In the Chronicle of Higher Education Tom Bartlett described the book as a "compelling read". In Anarchist Studies Peter Seyferth said the book "focuses on all the major phases of Chomsky's linguistic theories, their institutional preconditions and their ideological and political ramifications. And it is absolutely devastating."

David Golumbia has described himself as “a huge admirer of Decoding Chomsky” and Les Levidow said the book was “impressive”. The linguist Randy Allen Harris said “It’s a good and interesting book ... which everyone who is interested in Chomsky’s impact on contemporary culture should read.” Harris disagrees with some aspects of the book’s thesis. However, he describes Chomsky's misrepresentation of the book as absurd and, much like his fellow expert in Chomskyan linguistics Frederick Newmeyer, he does agree that:

Further research on Chomsky at MIT

In his book, Knight writes that the US military initially funded Chomsky's linguistics because they were interested in machine translation. Later their focus shifted and Knight cites Air Force Colonel Edmund Gaines’ statement that: "We sponsored linguistic research in order to learn how to build command and control systems that could understand English queries directly."

From 1963, Chomsky worked as a consultant to the MITRE Corporation, a military research institute set up by the US Air Force. According to one of Chomsky's former students, Barbara Partee, MITRE's justification for sponsoring Chomsky's approach to linguistics was "that in the event of a nuclear war, the generals would be underground with some computers trying to manage things, and that it would probably be easier to teach computers to understand English than to teach the generals to program."

Chomsky made his most detailed response to Knight in the 2019 book, The Responsibility of Intellectuals: Reflections by Noam Chomsky and others after 50 years. In this response, Chomsky dismissed Knight’s claims as a "vulgar exercise of defamation" and a "web of deceit and misinformation".

Knight, in turn, responded to Chomsky citing more documents, including one that states that MITRE's work to support "US Air Force-supplied command and control systems ... involves the application of a logico-mathematical formulation of linguistic structure developed by Noam Chomsky." Knight cites other documents that he claims show that Chomsky's student, Lieutenant Samuel Jay Keyser, did apply Chomskyan theory to the control of military aircraft, including the B-58 nuclear-armed bomber.

References

External links
 Science and Revolution – Chris Knight's website on his Chomsky research.
 

2016 non-fiction books
American non-fiction books
Books about the politics of science
Books by Chris Knight
English-language books
Works about Noam Chomsky
Books about linguists
Yale University Press books